Marcos Gonzalo Goñi (born 16 August 1998) is an Argentine footballer currently playing as a centre-back for Arsenal de Sarandí on loan from Godoy Cruz.

Career statistics

Club

Notes

References

1998 births
Living people
Argentine footballers
Association football defenders
Argentine Primera División players
Primera Nacional players
Boca Juniors footballers
Club Agropecuario Argentino players
Estudiantes de Buenos Aires footballers
Godoy Cruz Antonio Tomba footballers
Arsenal de Sarandí footballers